Xanabad (also, Khanabad) is a village and municipality in the Yevlakh Rayon of Azerbaijan.  It has a population of 1,699.

References 

Populated places in Yevlakh District